Margaret "Peggy" Seeger (born June 17, 1935) is an American folk singer. She has lived in Britain for more than 60 years, and was married to the singer and songwriter Ewan MacColl until his death in 1989.

First American period

Seeger's father was Charles Seeger (1886–1979), a folklorist and musicologist; her mother was Seeger's second wife, Ruth Porter Crawford (1901–1953), a modernist composer who was the first woman to receive a Guggenheim Fellowship. One of her brothers was Mike Seeger, and Pete Seeger was her half-brother. Poet Alan Seeger was her uncle. One of her first recordings was American Folk Songs for Children (1955).

In the 1950s, left-leaning singers such as Paul Robeson and The Weavers began to find that life became difficult because of the influence of McCarthyism. Seeger visited Communist China and as a result had her US passport withdrawn. In 1957, the US State Department had opposed Seeger's attending the 6th World Festival of Youth and Students in Moscow (where the CIA had monitored the US delegation), and was vigorously critical about her having gone to China during that trip, against official "advice".

The authorities had already warned her that her passport would be impounded, effectively barring her from further travel were she to return to the US. She therefore decided to tour Europeand later found out that she was on a blacklist sent to European governments. Staying in London in 1956, she performed accompanying herself on banjo. There she and Ewan MacColl fell in love. Previously married to director and actress Joan Littlewood, MacColl left his second wife, Jean Newlove, to become Seeger's lover.

In 1958, her UK work permit expired and she was about to be deported. This was narrowly averted by a plan, concocted by MacColl and Seeger, in which she married the folk singer Alex Campbell, in Paris, on January 24, 1959, in what Seeger described as a "hilarious ceremony". This marriage of convenience allowed Seeger to gain British citizenship and continue her relationship with MacColl. MacColl and Seeger were later married (in 1977), following his divorce from Newlove. They remained together until his death in 1989. They had three children: Neill, Calum, and Kitty. They recorded and released several albums together on Folkways Records, along with Seeger's solo albums and other collaborations with the Seeger Family and the Seeger Sisters.

Seeger was a leader in the introduction of the concertina to the English folk music revival. While not the only concertina player, her "musical skill and proselytizing zeal ... was a major force in spreading the gospel of concertina playing in the revival."

The documentary film A Kind of Exile was a profile of Seeger and also featured Ewan MacColl. The film was directed and produced by John Goldschmidt for ATV and shown on ITV in the UK.

Two social critics

Together with MacColl, Seeger founded The Critics Group, a "master class" for young singers performing traditional songs or to compose new songs using traditional song structures (or, as MacColl called them, "the techniques of folk creation"). The Critics Group evolved into a performance ensemble seeking to perform satirical songs in a mixture of theatre, comedy and song, which eventually created a series of annual productions called "The Festival of Fools" (named for a traditional British Isles event in which greater freedom of expression was allowed for the subjects of the king than was permitted during most of the year). Seeger and MacColl performed and recorded as a duo and as solo artists; MacColl wrote "The First Time Ever I Saw Your Face" in Seeger's honour (and did so during a long-distance phone call between the two, while Seeger was performing in America and MacColl was barred from traveling to the US with her due to his radical political views). None of the couple's numerous albums use any electric or electronic instrumentation.

Whilst MacColl wrote many songs about work and against war and prejudice, Seeger (who also wrote such songs) sang about women's issues, with many of her songs becoming anthems of the women's movement. Her most memorable was "I'm Gonna Be an Engineer". There were two major projects dedicated to the Child Ballads. The first was The Long Harvest (10 volumes 1966–75). The second was Blood and Roses (5 volumes, 1979–83). She visited the Greenham Common Women's Peace Camp, where protests against US cruise missiles were concentrated. For them she wrote "Carry Greenham Home". Seeger also ran a record label, Blackthorne Records, from 1976 to 1988.

In recent years

After the fall of the Soviet Union, US authorities began to soften their attitude towards Seeger. She returned to the United States in 1994 to live in Asheville, North Carolina. Seeger has continued to sing about women's issues. One of her most popular recent albums is Love Will Linger On (1995). She has published a collection of 150 of her songs from before 1999.

In 2011, Seeger edited The Essential Ewan MacColl Songbook.  Her introduction gave a detailed account of her life with MacColl.  She expressed some difference of political perspective between her and Ewan.

In 2006, Peggy Seeger relocated to Boston, Massachusetts, to accept a part-time teaching position at Northeastern University. In 2008, she began producing music videos pertaining to the Presidential campaigns, making them available through a YouTube page.

After 16 years of living in the United States, Seeger moved back to the United Kingdom in 2010 to be nearer to her children — since 2013 she has been living in Iffley, Oxford.

In 2012, she collaborated with experimental dance producer Broadcaster on an album of her songs set against dance beats.

Seeger identifies as bisexual and contributed an essay to Getting Bi: Voices of bisexuals around the world. In it she details a relationship she began with the traditional singer Irene Pyper-Scott (who lives in New Zealand) after Ewan MacColl died.

Seeger performed "Tell My Sister" on a live tribute album to the late Canadian folk artist Kate McGarrigle entitled Sing Me the Songs: Celebrating the Works of Kate McGarrigle. The album was released in June 2013.

Seeger's memoir, First Time Ever: A Memoir was published by Faber and Faber in October 2017.  A double CD of songs to accompany the memoir was released at the same time.

From early 2022 Seeger has been doing her "First Farewell" tour of Britain and Ireland.

Selected discography

Solo albums
 Folksongs of Courting and Complaint (1955)
 Animal Folksongs for Children (1957)
 Folksongs and Ballads (1957)
 A Song for You and Me (1962)
 The Best of Peggy Seeger (1963)
 Peggy Alone (1967)
 Penelope Isn't Waiting Anymore (1977)
 Different Therefore Equal (1979)
 The Folkways Years 1955 1992 Songs of Love and Politics (1992)
 Familiar Faces (1993)
 Songs of Love and Politics (1994)
 Love Will Linger On (1995)
 An Odd Collection (1996)
 Classic Peggy Seeger (1996)
 Period Pieces (1998)
 No Spring Chickens (1998)
 Almost Commercially Viable (2000)
 Heading For Home (2003)
 Love Call Me Home (2005)
 Bring Me Home (2008)
 Peggy Seeger Live (2012)
 Everything Changes (2014)
 Love Unbidden (26 June 2020)
 The First Farewell (9 April 2021)

With Ewan MacColl
 Second Shift – Industrial Ballads (1958)
 Chorus From The Gallows (1960)
 Popular Scottish Songs (1960)
 Singing The Fishing (1960)
 New Briton Gazette, Vol. 1 (1960)
 Classic Scots Ballads (1961)
 Bothy Ballads of Scotland (1961)
 Two Way Trip (1961)
 New Briton Gazette, Vol. 2 (1962)
 Jacobite Songs – The Two Rebellions 1715 and 1745 (1962)
 Steam Whistle Ballads (1964)
 Traditional Songs and Ballads (1964)
 The Amorous Muse (1966)
 The Manchester Angel (1966)
 The Long Harvest 1 (1966)
 The Long Harvest 2 (1967)
 The Long Harvest 3 (1968)
 The Angry Muse (1968)
 The Long Harvest 4 (1969)
 The Long Harvest 5 (1970)
 The World Of Ewan MacColl And Peggy Seeger (1970)
 The Long Harvest 6 (1971)
 The Long Harvest 7 (1972)
 The World Of Ewan MacColl And Peggy Seeger Vol. 2 – Songs from Radio Ballads (1972)
 At The Present Moment (1972)
 Folkways Record of Contemporary Songs  (1973)
 The Long Harvest 8 (1973)
 The Long Harvest 9 (1974)
 The Long Harvest 10 (1975)
 Saturday Night at The Bull and Mouth (1977)
 Cold Snap (1977)
 Hot Blast (1978)
 Blood and Roses (1979)
 Kilroy Was Here (1980)
 Blood and Roses 2 (1981)
 Blood and Roses 3 (1982)
 Blood and Roses 4 (1982)
 Blood and Roses 5 (1983)
 Freeborn Man (1983) [reissued 1989]
 Daddy, What did You Do in The Strike? (1984) [cassette mini-album]
 White Wind, Black Tide – Anti-Apartheid Songs (1986) [cassette album]
 Items of News (1986)

With Mike Seeger
 American Folk Songs Sung by the Seegers (1957)
 Peggy 'n' Mike (1967)
 American Folksongs for Children (1977)
 American Folk Songs for Christmas (1990)
 Fly Down Little Bird (2011)

With the Critics Group and Frankie Armstrong
 The Female Frolic (1967)
 Living Folk (1970)

With guests
 Three Score and Ten (concert) (2007)

Collaboration
 Who's Going to Shoe Your Pretty Little Foot (Topic UK version, 1964) – US version by Tom Paley and Peggy Seeger with Claudia Paley
 The Unfortunate Rake (1960) – In 2009, track sixteen from this album ("Girl on the Green Briar Shore") was included as track five on the seventh CD of Topic Records' 70-year anniversary boxed set, Three Score and Ten.

References

Further reading
MacColl, Ewan (1998) The Essential Ewan MacColl Songbook: sixty years of songmaking; ed. Peggy Seeger. New York: Oak Publications
 Harker, Ben (2007) Class Act: the Cultural and Political Life of Ewan MacColl. London: Pluto Press  (chapters: 1. Lower Broughton—-2. Red Haze—-3. Welcome, Comrade—-4. Browned Off—-5. A Richer, Fuller Life—-6. Towards a People's Culture—-7. Croydon, Soho, Moscow, Paris—-8. Bard of Beckenham—-9. Let a Hundred Flowers Blossom—-10. Sanctuary—-11. Endgame)
Seeger, Peggy (2002) The Peggy Seeger Songbook: Forty Years of Songmaking. Oak Publications Catalogue no: OK65054 
Freedman, Jean R (2017) Peggy Seeger: A Life of Music, Love and Politics University of Illinois Press (Summary)
Seeger, Peggy (2017) First Time Ever: A Memoir. Faber & Faber

External links

Official site
Biography from Appleseed Music
 
 
Lady, What Do you Do All Day?: Peggy Seeger's Anthems of Anglo-American Feminism: Thesis by Amber Cook (née Good)
TheBanjoMan.com Peggy Seeger Page

How Can I Keep From Singing?: A Seeger Family Tribute, Library of Congress, American Folklife Center, March 2007 symposium and concert. All events are available as webcasts via the site. Retrieved August 25, 2009.

1935 births
American folk singers
Seeger family
Tradition Records artists
Riverside Records artists
American feminists
Feminist musicians
Bisexual musicians
LGBT people from New York (state)
Bisexual women
Bisexual feminists
American expatriates in the United Kingdom
Singers from New York City
Living people
20th-century American women singers
21st-century American women singers
American LGBT singers
British LGBT singers
20th-century American singers
21st-century American singers
Topic Records artists
Folkways Records artists